Amy's Kitchen is a family-owned, privately-held American company based in Petaluma, California, that manufactures organic and non-GMO convenience and frozen foods. Founded in 1987 by Andy and Rachel Berliner, and incorporated since 1988, the company took its name from their daughter, Amy. All of Amy's 250+ products are vegetarian and made with organic ingredients. The company also operates a chain of four vegetarian fast food restaurants in California called Amy's Drive Thru.

Company
The co-founders of Amy's Kitchen, Andy and Rachel Berliner, had prior experience in the organic food business. Rachel's family had grown and advocated organic vegetables and fruits since the 1950s. Andy was formerly the president and majority shareholder of the Magic Mountain herb tea company.

The company's first product was the vegetable pot pie. After mounting a booth at a natural products exhibition, the Berliners began receiving orders from small natural grocers around the country. They soon opened a production facility in Sonoma County, California to meet demand.

Amy's employs over 2,700 people and its corporate headquarters is in Petaluma, California. It operates processing plants in Santa Rosa, California, Medford, Oregon, Pocatello, Idaho, and formerly at San Jose, California. A new processing plant in Goshen, New York is expected to open in 2022.

Amy's Kitchen supports non-GMO food and GMO labeling initiatives, and was a major sponsor of Farm Aid's annual benefit concert in 2012, 2013, and 2014.

In May 2017, the company hired a new global president, former Mars Inc. executive Xavier Unkovic who had worked as global president of Mars Drinks, CEO of Royal Canin Canada and CEO of Royal Canin USA. Unkovic was promoted to CEO in August 2020 but left the company in May 2021.

Because Amy's is a private entity, its annual earnings are not public knowledge. It reported gross sales of over $300 million in 2012 on CNBC's "How I Made My Millions." In 2017, the company's revenue was reportedly over $500 million per year in the U.S., the U.K., and France, and was expanding financially in Asia and Australia. In 2020, it rose to $600 million per year with demand from the coronavirus pandemic.

The company achieved B Corporation certification in late 2020, indicating it demonstrates high standards of social and environmental performance.

Safety violations and labor relations

Amy's has been criticized for its working conditions and has had to pay over $100,000 to the Occupational Safety and Health Administration to settle serious federal health and safety violations. In January and February 2022, Cal/OSHA’s records show an investigator visited the plant on three days in late January and early February. Workplace safety inspectors fined the company $25,070 for three serious violations and 10 other infractions after inspections of the company’s Santa Rosa food production plant. According to the California Division of Occupational Safety, regulators found the company did not ensure that machines to prepare tortillas had proper safety guards secured over hazardous machine components. The agency fined Amy’s $10,125 for the oversight. On the same day, investigators found that emergency showers and eyewash stations were either not reachable within 10 seconds or were not kept free of obstacles, which resulted in a $6,750 fine.

The company has also been accused of union busting. In June 2022, workers at its San Jose facility reported dangerous working conditions, health and safety issues, and poor labor practices. In August, the same plant was shutdown after workers started to organize a union  with Unite Here, a union representing approximately 300,000 workers in Canada and the U.S. The closure occurred after Amy's Kitchen had disciplined employees for participation in labor activities, coupled with the termination of two employees for supporting a union. Unite Here is seeking a temporary injunction to halt the practices.

Products

As of 2017, the company makes more than 250 organic products in 27 categories, including burritos, bowls, pizza, wraps, soup, chili, and candy. All of Amy's products are vegetarian. Amy's products do not contain meat, animal rennet, seafood, eggs, peanuts, bioengineered ingredients, or hydrogenated oils. 

The majority of the food products have Kosher certification; there are a small number that still do not as the company is still in the process of transitioning to 100% Kosher as of 2020. The company has over 120 vegan offerings and makes over 130 gluten-free products. Amy's is widely available in the United States and Canada, and increasingly available in other countries such as the U.K., Germany, and Australia. Distribution is growing in Latin America, Southeast Asia, and China.

Amy's Drive Thru

The first Amy's Drive Thru restaurant opened in Rohnert Park, California, on July 20, 2015. It is a vegetarian fast food restaurant concept, featuring veggie burgers, shakes, French fries, pizzas, macaroni and cheese and salads. Vegan and gluten free menu options are available. In July 2019, a takeaway location was opened at San Francisco International Airport in the newly remodeled Harvey Milk Terminal 1. A third Amy's Drive Thru opened in Corte Madera in August 2020, followed by one in Roseville, California in December 2021. The company plans to open locations in Aliso Viejo and Thousand Oaks in 2022.

See also
 List of vegetarian and vegan companies
Daiya

References

External links

Companies based in Sonoma County, California
Economy of Santa Rosa, California
Food and drink in the San Francisco Bay Area
Privately held companies based in California
Vegetarian companies and establishments of the United States
American companies established in 1987
Food and drink companies established in 1987
1987 establishments in California
Food and drink companies based in California
Petaluma, California
B Lab-certified corporations